Retinoic acid receptor gamma (RAR-γ), also known as NR1B3 (nuclear receptor subfamily 1, group B, member 3) is a nuclear receptor encoded by the RARG gene. Adapalene selectively targets retinoic acid receptor beta and retinoic acid receptor gamma and its agonism of the gamma subtype is largely responsible for adapalene's observed effects.

Interactions 

Retinoic acid receptor gamma has been shown to interact with NCOR1.

See also 
 Retinoic acid receptor

References

Further reading 

 
 
 
 
 
 
 
 
 
 
 
 
 
 
 
 
 
 
 

Intracellular receptors
Transcription factors